Gluvia is a monotypic genus of daesiid camel spiders, first described by Carl Ludwig Koch in 1842. Its single species, Gluvia dorsalis is one of the only species of solifugid found in Portugal and Spain. It is reported to be a common species on the streets of Madrid.

References 

Solifugae
Arachnid genera
Monotypic arachnid genera
Animals described in 1817
Fauna of the Iberian Peninsula